S600 can refer to:
 S600, a Canon S Series printer
 Nikon Coolpix S600, a digital camera
 Honda S600, a 1964–1966 automobile
 Mercedes-Benz S600, a car model
 S600, a Sendo mobile phone model
 Shorland S600, a 1995 armoured personnel carrier model
 Snapdragon 600, a quad-core mobile processor by Qualcomm

See also